Faith Academy is a Christian Secondary School located in Canaanland, Ota. It was established in 1999.

References

External links 
 https://web.archive.org/web/20190502234503/http://www1.davidoyedepoministries.org/

Secondary schools in Ogun State
Educational institutions established in 1999
1999 establishments in Nigeria